Hawkstone Park is a destination on the English Grand Tour and is a historic landscape park with pleasure grounds and gardens historically associated with Soulton Hall and Hawkstone Hall.   

It is located north east of the small village of Weston-under-Redcastle, near to Wem, in Shropshire, England.  It is known for its follies.

Park

A climax in the development of the landscape is considered to be associated with the work of Richard Hill (1655–1727), also known as 'The Great Hill', circa 1707. The follies, estate and reputation were further enhanced by his nephew and heir Sir Rowland Hill, 1st Baronet Hill of Hawkstone (1705–1783) and then Sir Richard Hill, 2nd Baronet (1733–1808) during the 18th century.

The park endured a century of neglect and decay until an ongoing programme of restoration was started in 1990, enabling it to be re-opened in 1993. It is now scheduled as Grade-1 listed on the National Register of Historic Parks and Gardens. It takes a 2.5-hour hiking tour to completely see each folly and their landscapes (a reasonable level of physical fitness and mobility is required and there are many steps, ascents and descents). At some times of the year, not all site trails are accessible.

History

Castle

Red Castle, the first castle at Hawkstone Park, was built in 1227 by Henry de Audley (Alditheley),  Sheriff of Shropshire and Staffordshire. This Norman enclosure castle was built of sandstone on a natural outcrop of rock, flanked on all sides by wide valleys. The castle has been known by various names: Red Castle; Rubree; Radeclif, Redcliffe, Redde, Castle Rous, and Hawkstone. About the same time (1227-1232) Henry also built Heighley Castle at Madeley, Staffordsire, and made it the family caput. Subsequent generations of Audleys were also known as, Lords of Heleigh Castle, and expanded from there.  The site of the Red Castle is closed to the public as it is unsafe. It takes up the top of Red Castle Hill (the westerly outcropping hill of the park grounds), a crag overlooking the golf course and Weston to its South East. John Tuchet, 4th Baron Audley (1371–1408) inherited the title via his sister, then survived the uprising of Owain Glyndŵr and the Battle of Shrewsbury in 1403, where he fought against Henry "Hotspur" Percy. His son James Tuchet, 5th Baron Audley (1398–1459) was killed by Sir Roger Kynaston, whilst leading the House of Lancaster at the Battle of Blore Heath in 1459. The Audleys forfeited the title when James Tuchet, 7th Baron Audley (c. 1463–1497) led a rebellion against King Henry VII of England in 1497 and was executed. The Audley title was restored to John Tuchet, 8th Baron Audley in 1512.

The "Red Castle", as it became known, was held by the family until the early 16th century initially as their main Shropshire stronghold. Repairs were undertaken in 1283. It was in use in 1322, but by around 1400 it seems no longer occupied. 

When Leland visited the castle in around 1540 he described it as ruinous.

Residences 
By the sixteenth century, the manors of Hawkstone and Soulton were sold in 1556 by Thomas Lodge to Sir Rowland Hill and Thomas Leigh under long leases (until 1610) for quiet enjoyment by his brother Edward Lodge.

Hawkstone Hall 
Eventually the lands passed via Sir Andrew Corbet of Moreton Corbet to Sir Rowland Hill, 1st Baronet Hill of Hawkstone (1705–1783), who lived nearby at Shelvock Manor. He of the family of Sir Rowland Hill, the first Protestant Lord Mayor of the City of London and Member of Parliament for the City of London in 1533, and who had owned Hawkstone and nearby Soulton

Hall
Richard Hill (1655–1727), 'The Great Hill', traveller and diplomat, had made a fortune by 'lucrative arithmetick' (sic), raised the family into the aristocracy, and established the existing Hawkstone Manor House as the family seat, He started partial demolition of the house in 1701 replacing it with the Hall, completing it circa 1707.

Sir Rowland Hill, 1st Baronet (1705–1783), landscaped the Red Castle and extended the estate, with walks over the four natural hills and a wide range of follies that included a hermit to dispense wisdom to visitors.

Sir Richard Hill, 2nd Baronet (1733–1808) took over on his father’s death in 1783, published a guide for visitors and built the 'Hawkstone Inn' to accommodate them. He engaged landscape gardener William Emes to build a vast manmade lake, the Hawk River and his follies included a 'ruined' Gothic architecture Arch on Grotto Hill, the urn, a tribute to an English Civil War ancestor, the Swiss Bridge, and the  obelisk with an internal staircase, topped by a statue of the original Sir Rowland Hill. Hawkstone Park had become one of Britain’s top attractions by the time he died in 1808. It maintained this status under his brother Sir John Hill, 3rd Baronet (1740–1824).

Sir Rowland Hill, 4th Baronet Hill of Hawkstone, 2nd Viscount Hill (1800–1875) inherited, spent and lost a large fortune. He created two new drives, one at vast expense through a rock cutting, and even considered completely relocating the hall across the park. In 1824-5 he built a dower house known as The Citadel in Gothic Revival style. His extravagance and bad management caused a descent into a mess that was inherited by his son in 1875.

Rowland Clegg-Hill, the 3rd Viscount Hill (1833–1895) was bankrupt by the time of his death in 1895, forcing the sale of the contents of the hall and then the split up of the estate by 1906.

During World War II, parts of the park were used as a prisoner of war camp.

Hawkstone Park is now largely restored, and once again open to the public.  It is protected as a Grade I historic park, as rated by English Heritage.

Culture and cultural references 
Dr. Johnson visited and wrote of...
"its prospects, the awfulness of its shades, the horrors of its precipices, the verdure of its hollows and the loftiness of its rocks ... above is inaccessible altitude, below is horrible profundity." (1774).

Erasmus Darwin also visited, and notes the outcrops of copper-bearing rocks...
"at Hawkstone in Shropshire, the seat of Sir Richard Hill, there is an elevated rock of siliceous sand which is coloured green with copper in many places high in the air." (1783).
The Park was used to represent parts of Narnia in the BBC's TV adaptation of C. S. Lewis's books for the battlegrounds in The Lion, the Witch and the Wardrobe in 1988 and Prince Caspian a year later.

Current Operations 

Hawkstone is currently combined with an adjacent hotel (formerly a lodge of the hall) marketed in association with the Principal Hayley Group, golf course.

Golf course
Hawkstone Park has two 18-hole golf courses, set in and around the parkland. Sandy Lyle was tutored in golf by his father Alex, who was the resident golf professional at Hawkstone.

See also
Listed buildings in Weston-under-Redcastle

References

External links

 Hawkstone Park
 Hawkstone Park Hotel
 Hawkstone Hall
  Images of Hawkstone Park on Odd-stuff!
 www.geograph.co.uk : photos of Hawkstone Park and surrounding area
 "Red Castle (photo)"
 "Map of the Red Castle site"
 BBC Shropshire page on Hawkstone Hall

Gardens in Shropshire
Tourist attractions in Shropshire
Folly buildings in England
Golf clubs and courses in Shropshire